The 2016 season was the Hawthorn Football Club's 92nd season in the Australian Football League and 115th overall, the 17th season playing home games at the Melbourne Cricket Ground, the 16th season playing home games at Aurora Stadium, the 12th season under head coach Alastair Clarkson, and the 6th season with Luke Hodge as club captain. Hawthorn entered the season as the three-time defending AFL premiers, having won back-to-back-to-back AFL premierships.

Hawthorn improved on its 16–6 record in 2015, finishing in 3rd with a  record.

Hawthorn were defeated by  83–85 in the qualifying final. Isaac Smith had the chance to win the game with a goal after the siren but hooked the kick right of the goal. This ended a three-game finals winning streak. It was also the second consecutive season Hawthorn were defeated in the Qualifying final. Hawthorn were eliminated from the finals by the eventual premiers  84–107 in the semi-final, ending their chances of a four-peat, the second four-peat in VFL/AFL history after  (1927–1930), and the first four-peat in the AFL era. This was the first time since 2010 Hawthorn didn't win a final, the first time since 2010 Hawthorn didn't advance to the preliminary final, and the first time since 2011 Hawthorn didn't advance to the AFL Grand Final.

Club summary
The 2016 AFL season is the 120th season of the VFL/AFL competition since its inception in 1897; having entered the competition in 1925, it was the 92nd season contested by the Hawthorn Football Club. Tasmania and iiNet continued as the club's two major sponsors, as they had done since 2006 and 2013 respectively, while Adidas continued to manufacture the club's on-and-off field apparel, as they had done since 2013. Hawthorn continued its alignment with the Box Hill Hawks Football Club in the Victorian Football League, allowing Hawthorn-listed players to play with the Box Hill Hawks when not selected in AFL matches.

Senior personnel
Alastair Clarkson continued as the club's head coach for the twelfth consecutive season, while Luke Hodge continued as the club's captain for the sixth consecutive season. Both have held their respective positions since 2005 and 2011, respectively.

There were several changes to the coaching panel following the end of last season, the most notable of which was Brendon Bolton's departure from the club towards the end of the season to become the head coach of the Carlton Football Club. On 20 October 2015, recent  retiree Chris Newman joined the club as a development coach, replacing Damian Carroll who was promoted to assistant coach alongside Alastair Clarkson.

On 2 February 2016, Andrew Newbold stepped down as the club's president, and was replaced in the role by vice-captain Richard Garvey.

Playing list changes
The following lists all player changes between the conclusion of the 2015 season and the beginning of the 2016 season.

Trades

Free Agency

Departures

Draft

AFL draft

Rookie draft

Retirements and delistings

2016 player squad

Season summary

Pre-season matches
The club played three practice matches as part of the 2016 NAB Challenge, and will be played under modified pre-season rules, including nine-point goals.

Premiership season

Fixture summary

The full fixture was announced on 29 October 2015. The Melbourne Cricket Ground once again acted as Hawthorn's primary home ground, hosting seven of the club's eleven home games, while four games were played at their secondary home ground, Aurora Stadium, in Launceston.

For the second consecutive year, and the third in the past four years, the club opened its season with an Easter Monday clash against  at the Melbourne Cricket Ground; it was also be the first time since 2011 in which it started a season with an away match, and, due to the weighted rule, it was the only time the two teams met during the regular season. Its first home game came the following round, when they faced the West Coast Eagles at the Melbourne Cricket Ground in the 2015 AFL Grand Final rematch. Their match against , scheduled for Round 6, was once again played at Spotless Stadium in Sydney, while the club travelled to the Gabba for the first time since 2008 to take on the Brisbane Lions in the AFL's Indigenous Round.

Fixture

Ladder

Finals

Awards, records and milestones

Awards
Peter Crimmins Medal
Sam Mitchell
2016 All-Australian team
Cyril Rioli
Round 13
James Sicily – 2016 AFL Rising Star nominee

Records
Round 11:
Round 20:
Hawthorn's 29-point loss to Melbourne ended a 13-game winning streak against that club dating back to Round 2, 2007.

Milestones
Round 1: 
Marc Pittonet – AFL debut
Paul Puopolo – 100th AFL goal
Round 2: 
Josh Gibson – 1st AFL goal for Hawthorn
Round 4:
Sam Mitchell – most possessions in a single match in his career (44)
Round 5:
Shaun Burgoyne – 300th AFL game
Round 6:
Kieran Lovell – AFL debut
Daniel Howe – first AFL goal
Round 7:
Kaiden Brand – AFL debut
Round 10:
Jordan Lewis – 250th AFL game
Round 11:
Josh Gibson – 200th AFL game
Kade Stewart – AFL debut
Round 12:
Shaun Burgoyne – 150th club game for Hawthorn
Luke Breust – 250th AFL goal
Jack Gunston – 250th AFL goal
Round 16:
Cyril Rioli – 250th AFL goal
Round 17:
Shaun Burgoyne – 250th AFL goal
Round 18:
Sam Mitchell – 300th AFL game
Round 19:
Blake Hardwick – AFL debut
Round 20:
Kurt Heatherley – AFL debut
Round 21:
Ryan Burton – AFL debut
Round 22:
Jonathon Ceglar – 50th AFL game
Round 23:
Jack Fitzpatrick – first AFL game for Hawthorn (previously with )
Qualifying Final
Ryan Schoenmakers – 100th AFL game

Brownlow Medal

Results

Brownlow Medal tally

 italics denotes ineligible player

Tribunal cases

References

Hawthorn Football Club Season, 2016
Hawthorn Football Club seasons